Liloan, officially the Municipality of Liloan, is a 4th class municipality in the province of Southern Leyte, Philippines. According to the 2020 census, it has a population of 24,800 people.

Liloan's town center is located at the northern part of Panaon Island which is connected to the mainland of Leyte by a bridge (Wawa Bridge).

"Liloan" is derived from the local term lilo, meaning "whirlpool". Whirlpools can be seen at Panaon Strait, the navigable narrow waterway between the mainland of Leyte and Panaon island.

Geography

Barangays
Liloan is politically subdivided into 24 barangays.

* -This indicates a mainland Barangay.

Climate

Demographics

The upsurge of the population of Barangay Fatima is due to the relocation of almost all residents of Malangza and Catig because of the frequent threats of landslides.

Economy

Tourism
 Bitoon Beach, 500 meters from the Wawa Bridge
 Molopolo Beach, at Brgy Molopolo
 Tagbak Marine Park (250 meters from Wawa Bridge)
 Our Lady of Mt. Carmel Cross (pilgrim site)
 Duwangan Beach
 Liloan Lighthouse
 Liloan Ferry Terminal
 Pres. Quezon (maugoc) Pook Adventure Park (adventure site)
 Ollie's Wall (Dive Site) at Gud-an
 Washing Machine Dive at Wawa channel
 Maga-upas Color (Busay) Water Falls at Brgy Magaupas
 Asug Cave (found a skeletal remains believe to be from a Javaman) at Brgy Nailong (Pres. Roxas) and Brgy Ilag.
 Puti na Bato AKA White Horse, a Rock Cliff formation with a printed shape of a white horse at Brgy Ilag

Transportation

Land 
Philtranco serves Liloan from Pasay to Davao. Other major bus companies including DLTBCo, CUL Transportation, Ultrabus and Bachelor Express also serve Liloan from Maasin, Ormoc, Tacloban, and Calbayog.

Sea 
 Liloan Port or also known as Liloan Ferry Terminal is a roro port that serves a local point from Manila and Davao, as well as a local point from Lipata Port, also connects to the Pan-Philippine Highway also called Maharlika Highway AH26 that originates from Laoag to its southern terminus Zamboanga City. FastCat is one of the primary shipping line that serves to and from Lipata Port, Surigao City. Other major shipping line including Santa Clara Shipping Corporation and Starlite Ferries also serves Liloan from Lipata.

See also
Liloan, Cebu - a municipality in Cebu
Liloan - a barangay in Santander, Cebu

References

External links
 Liloan Profile at PhilAtlas.com
Official Website of Liloan
 [ Philippine Standard Geographic Code]
Philippine Census Information
Local Governance Performance Management System

Municipalities of Southern Leyte